The Sparks station is a former passenger train station in Sparks, Nevada. Amtrak service commenced when the company assumed passenger operations in the United States in 1971. Prior to closing in 2009, it was served daily by Amtrak's (the National Railroad Passenger Corporation) California Zephyr, running once daily between Chicago, Illinois, and Emeryville, California (in the San Francisco Bay Area). Although the California Zephyr still passes through Sparks, it no longer stops at the station.

In May 2009, the station was closed because of its proximity to Reno ( to the west). Safety issues also played a part, as the former station was in a freight yard and what appears to be the station building is actually a Union Pacific yard office. Amtrak Thruway bus services continue to stop nearby at Nugget Casino Resort. Freight operations continue under Union Pacific.

References

External links

Sparks Amtrak Station (USA Rail Guide – TrainWeb)
Sparks Amtrak Station at RailCards.com
Sparks Intermodal Facility – Union Pacific

Former Amtrak stations in Nevada
Buildings and structures in Sparks, Nevada
Railway stations closed in 2009
Union Pacific Railroad stations
Properties of the Union Pacific Railroad
Former Southern Pacific Railroad stations in Nevada